The Islamic Iran Resistance Front or Resistance Front of Islamic Iran, or simply Resistance Front, also translated Endurance Front, is an Iranian principlist political group, founded in 2011. The group is associated with Mohsen Rezaee. They competed with an electoral list in the 2012 Iranian legislative election, and were able to win 18 exclusive seats (not shared with other lists). The group endorsed 31 candidates for Tehran City Council in the 2013 Iranian local elections, two of the candidates won seats.

Development and Justice Party and Green Party are affiliated with the front.

Presidential candidates

Notes

References

2011 establishments in Iran
Principlist political groups in Iran
Political parties established in 2011
Electoral lists for Iranian legislative election, 2012
Centrist parties in Iran